The 2022 Clarington municipal election was held from Tuesday, October 18–24, 2022, to elect a mayor, local councillors and school trustees to the Clarington Municipal Council in Clarington, Ontario, Canada. 2022 was the first year that Clarington used electronic voting. Adrian Foster, the incumbent mayor was re-elected for his fourth term, with 42% of the vote.

20,606 voters of 73,471 eligible voters (28%) cast a ballot.

Mayoral election

Regional Councillor

Wards 1 and 2

Wards 3 and 4

Local Councillor

Ward 1 Courtice

Ward 2 Bowmanville-West

Ward 3 Bowmanville-East

Ward 4 Newcastle

Durham Regional Chair

School Trustee elections

Kawartha Pine Ridge District School Board

Peterborough Victoria Northumberland and Clarington Catholic District School Board

Conseil scolaire Viamonde Trustee

References

Clarington
Elections in Clarington